The Women's 4 x 400 metres relay event  at the 2005 European Athletics Indoor Championships was held on March 6.

Results

4 × 400 metres relay at the European Athletics Indoor Championships
2005 European Athletics Indoor Championships
2005 in women's athletics